The Stearns Golf Course, at 131 Clubhouse Dr. in Stearns, Kentucky, was listed on the National Register of Historic Places in 2015.

The nomination included  including the  golf course, a log clubhouse built in 1936, and a kidney-shaped in-ground pool.  The clubhouse and pool were funded by the Works Progress Administration.  It was located in a coal company town and the NRHP nomination described it as "'a very unusual place, as well as a significant one. It shows the lengths that some coal companies went to create a familiar experience in a very foreign place, importing a feature of urban leisure in a place of rural work.'"

References

National Register of Historic Places in McCreary County, Kentucky
Works Progress Administration in Kentucky
Golf clubs and courses in Kentucky
1936 establishments in Kentucky
Clubhouses on the National Register of Historic Places in Kentucky
Cultural infrastructure completed in 1936